A special election was held in  on April 13, 1795, to fill a vacancy left by Jonathan Trumbull, Jr. (F)'s election to the Senate.

Election results

See also 
 List of special elections to the United States House of Representatives
 United States House of Representatives elections, 1794 and 1795
 List of United States representatives from Connecticut

References 

Connecticut 1795 at-large
Connecticut 1795 at-large
1795 at-large
Connecticut at-large
United States House of Representatives at-large
United States House of Representatives 1795 At-large